Ramenye is a rural locality (a village) in Bogolyubovskoye Rural Settlement, Suzdalsky District, Vladimir Oblast, Russia. The population was 174 as of 2010. There are 7 streets.

Geography 
Ramenye is located on the Nerl River, 47 km southeast of Suzdal (the district's administrative centre) by road. Baskaki is the nearest locality.

References 

Rural localities in Suzdalsky District